Aleksandr Sergeyevich Bosov (born 15 August 2000) is a Russian football player. He plays for FC Irtysh Omsk.

Club career
He made his debut in the Russian Football National League for FC Akron Tolyatti on 30 August 2020 in a game against FC Baltika Kaliningrad.

References

External links
 
 Profile by Russian Football National League
 

2000 births
Sportspeople from Tolyatti
Living people
Russian footballers
Association football midfielders
PFC Krylia Sovetov Samara players
FC Akron Tolyatti players
FC Irtysh Omsk players
Russian First League players
Russian Second League players